Westchester County Airport  is a county-owned airport in Westchester County, New York, three miles (6 km) northeast of downtown White Plains, with territory in the towns of North Castle and Harrison, New York, and village of Rye Brook, New York. It is sometimes referred to as the White Plains Airport and is so identified by the Official Airline Guide (OAG).

The airport primarily serves Westchester County, New York, and Fairfield County, Connecticut; the New York–Connecticut state border runs along its eastern perimeter. Being approximately 33 miles (53 km) north of Midtown Manhattan, it is also considered a satellite or reliever airport for the New York metropolitan area.

HPN is currently serviced by 5 airlines, including regional code-sharing affiliates with scheduled flights for their major airline partners, to 20 destinations throughout the United States. 3 scheduled charter airlines also offer flights and the New York Knicks and Rangers use the airport for charter flights during the season.

The National Plan of Integrated Airport Systems for 2011–2015 categorized HPN as a primary commercial service airport. Per Federal Aviation Administration records, the airport had 904,482 passenger enplanements in calendar year 2008, 964,927 in 2009, and 999,831 in 2010.

History
Westchester County Airport was built during World War II in 1942 as a home to an Air National Guard unit to protect New York City and Rye Lake, part of the city's water supply system. In May 1983, with the growth of suburban Westchester, the Guard unit abandoned Westchester Air National Guard Base and moved to Stewart International Airport, in Orange County.

The first scheduled airline flights were by American Airlines in late 1949 with a weekday morning flight from New York LaGuardia Airport to HPN continuing to Syracuse Hancock International Airport and beyond and returning in the evening. Mohawk Airlines replaced American in 1955; Mohawk and successor Allegheny Airlines served HPN until 1979. The first scheduled jet flight was a Mohawk BAC One-Eleven in 1965. Before the federal Airline Deregulation Act in 1978, the airport was served in 1976 by Allegheny Airlines BAC One-Elevens and by several commuter air carriers including Air Speed, Command Airways and Commuter Airlines. Air Florida arrived in 1980 and United Airlines during the mid-1980s. American Airlines also resumed mainline service. Regional carrier Independence Air ceased operations at HPN on January 5, 2006.

Major airlines that previously served the airport include American Airlines, Northwest Airlines, Republic Airlines (1979-1986), United Airlines and USAir (now part of American Airlines). New start up carriers Air Florida, AirTran Airways, Carnival Air Lines and Midway Airlines also served the airport. AirTran Airways began service at the airport in 2006 with flights to Atlanta, Orlando and West Palm Beach. These flights ended on August 11, 2012.  Smaller regional and commuter air carriers that previously operated flights included Air North, Altair Airlines, Business Express Airlines, Boston-Maine Airways (operating as Pan Am Clipper Connection), Brockway Air, Command Airways, Commuter Airlines, Continental Express (now United Express), Empire Airlines, Independence Air, Island Air, Mall Airways and USAir Express.

These airlines operated the following jets to the airport:

 Air Florida – Boeing 737-200
 AirTran – Boeing 717-200
 Allegheny Airlines – BAC One-Eleven
 American Airlines – Fokker 100
 Carnival Air Lines – Boeing 737-200
 Continental Express – Embraer ERJ-135 (operated by ExpressJet for Continental Airlines)
 Empire Airlines – Fokker F28 Fellowship
 Midway Airlines – Douglas DC-9-10
 Mohawk Airlines – BAC One-Eleven
 Northwest Airlines – McDonnell Douglas DC-9-30
 Northwest Jetlink (operated by Mesaba Airlines on behalf of Northwest Airlines) - Avro RJ85
 Republic Airlines (1979-1986) – McDonnell Douglas DC-9-30
 United Airlines – Boeing 737-200, 737-300 and 737-500
 USAir – Fokker 100

In the summer of 1981 Air Florida's timetable listed international nonstop Boeing 737-200 service to Bermuda from the airport.

In June 2005, a drunken teenager and two of his friends stole a Cessna 172 from nearby Danbury Municipal Airport around 1AM and landed on a taxiway at Westchester County Airport around 4AM. The aircraft was low on fuel and allegedly flying erratically. HPN airport was closed at the time and no runway lights were illuminated. Police arrived on the scene and reported beer bottles falling out of the aircraft as they arrested the teens, all of whom were charged with various felonies relating to the unauthorized use of the aircraft, theft, and alcohol impairment.

JetBlue began service at the airport in 2007 and is currently the airport's largest carrier with 14 daily round-trips to 8 destinations, 5 of which are year-round and in Florida—Fort Lauderdale, Fort Myers, Orlando, Tampa, and West Palm Beach. The 6th, 7th, and 8th are seasonal service to Charleston (SC), Nantucket, and Martha’s Vineyard.

In June 2009, Cape Air commenced service to Westchester with flights to Nantucket and Martha's Vineyard in Massachusetts. They then introduced service to Lebanon Municipal Airport in New Hampshire in early 2010. In the summer of 2022, they eliminated all flights out of White Plains except for subsidized essential air service routes from Lebanon. There are no plans to return this service in the future.

In June 2010, a regional airline affiliate for Air Canada announced it would cease all flights into the airport. Commuter code sharing service with Beechcraft turboprop aircraft was flown on behalf of Air Canada for several years between the airport and Toronto. This ended international flights until service to the Bahamas began in 2011. The airport currently does not have any international nonstop service.

On November 18, 2010, American Airlines ended their American Eagle regional airline service to the airport and instead introduced American Connection flights operated by Chautauqua Airlines as a replacement flying smaller Embraer ERJ-140 regional jet aircraft. Later, the American Connection name was dropped and American Eagle service returned.

In 2013, Delta Air Lines announced that they would begin seasonal service to Orlando starting in December of that year. Delta ceased operation of the route, leaving JetBlue as the only airline that currently serves it.

In December 2015, Tradewind Aviation began service to the Morrisville–Stowe Airport in northern Vermont.

In August 2016, American Airlines announced nonstop service to Miami via its American Eagle subsidiary with 2 round-trip flights daily on board their Embraer E175 aircraft operated by Republic Airways. Service commenced on December 15, 2016, only to cease in late 2017. On September 6, 2022, American announced they would relaunch this route on January 10, 2023, with 1 daily round-trip E175 flight lasting until May 3, 2022. Envoy Air will operate this flight as American Eagle.

Between December 2 and 20, 2017, Delta Air Lines upgauged 1–2 flights on select days to Boeing 717-200 aircraft to test increased payload feasibility to HPN. This was necessitated by the airport's limit of 240 arriving and departing passengers per half-hour; operators who exceed this cap are fined. As of the present time, Delta uses this equipment for flights on the HPN-ATL route on a full-time basis along with the Bombardier CRJ900.

On November 13, 2018, JetBlue announced that they would be offering service to Nantucket from HPN on a seasonal and 5x round-trip flight per week basis on board the Embraer E190 stating in June 2019. JetBlue didn't operate this route in 2020 due to the COVID-19 pandemic. It currently operates this route 1x daily but still on a seasonal basis.

On April 27, 2020, the airport was closed to general aviation traffic for one week and commercial airlines for about a month so Runway 16/34 could be repaved, a project originally scheduled to span four months with construction only occurring from midnight to 6 AM. This decision was made in the midst of COVID-19 pandemic-related air travel cuts, which drastically reduced commercial airline service to the airport. Some operators were forced to ferry their aircraft to nearby airports where they could continue flights. This was the first total shutdown of a U.S. commercial airport for reasons relating to the COVID-19 pandemic.

On April 20, 2022, Breeze Airways announced several new routes from the airport, including the airport's first-ever commercial transcontinental service, with flights to Las Vegas (dropped after October 2, 2022), Los Angeles, and San Francisco (cancelled), on board the airline's Airbus A220-300. Other new service that was announced from the airport included flights to Charleston (SC), Jacksonville (FL), Norfolk, and Savannah.

On August 8, 2022, Delta began selling flights to Boston, with the first flight taking-off on October 6, 2022. The route currently operates 2x-3x daily (except on Saturdays) using Delta’s Embraer E175 operated by Republic Airways.

On August 10, 2022, according to their website, Breeze cancelled planned service from HPN to San Francisco and also dropped planned service to Las Vegas after October 2, 2022 (HPN-LAS only operated on Sundays and Thursdays from 9/8/22 to 10/2/22). New service also appeared, including flights to Nashville and Sarasota. The former route commenced on November 4, 2022 but ended just under 2 months later on January 2, 2023. The latter route commenced on November 2, 2022 and is currently flown using the airline’s Embraer E195.

On October 18, 2022, Breeze began selling flights to Vero Beach, which started on February 3, 2023. The route currently operates 3x weekly, increasing to 5x weekly in May 2023, using the airline’s Embraer E195.

On March 1, 2023, JetBlue announced that they would fly from HPN to Charleston (SC) and Martha’s Vineyard on a seasonal basis, with flights starting on May 25, 2023. They will be operated daily during the summer. Charleston is currently served by Breeze Airways on a year-round and near-daily basis while Martha’s Vineyard was last served commercially in Summer 2021 by Cape Air (Tradewind Aviation currently serves it but only on a charter basis). This brings JetBlue up to an airport-leading 8 destinations, 3 of which are seasonal.

Several capital projects are planned, including a new US Customs and Border Protection facility and a new ARFF Station.

Noise abatement systems and procedures
In its effort to mitigate aircraft noise pollution into neighboring communities, HPN maintains six major noise abatement programs that are in effect daily.

One of them is its Voluntary Restraint from Flying Program (VRFF), sometimes referred to as a voluntary curfew, that helps assuage anti-airport complainants by requesting—not mandating—that operators refrain from flying into the airport between midnight and 6:30 AM. Those that breach the VRFF are reminded of the initiative and notified of any noise complaints that may have resulted from their operations.

The airport's Airport Noise and Operations Monitoring System (ANOMS) collects noise data from remote noise-monitoring terminals, and both registered aircraft and community noise levels are published in the Airport Monitor. This system works in conjunction with the High Range Noise Event (HRNE) Program; ANOMS staff can identity any operator who causes a maximum noise level event of 90.0 decibels or higher at any of its remote noise monitor terminals and advise them in order to prevent future noise level transgressions. As of September 2020, there are no fines, penalties, or aircraft restrictions associated with this program.

Additionally, HPN prohibits intersection takeoffs from its runways and restricts maintenance runups and use of reverse thrust. It also employs Advanced Authorization for operations.

Local context
Following several renovations and discussions about the airport's viability, HPN is currently served by 5 airlines with flights to 20 destinations throughout the United States. Although there has long been controversy over the airport and its proposed expansions, concerns have also arisen regarding travelers seeking relief from long delays at the other New York metropolitan area airports, such as John F. Kennedy International Airport (JFK) and LaGuardia Airport (LGA).

More recently, these concerns pertain to flight paths and vehicular congestion. The latter has been addressed by the County of Westchester with Bee-Line Bus System (bus #12 from downtown White Plains) service to the airport and the encouragement of travelers to share rides to the airport.

The airport's environmental management performance is monitored through its ISO 14001 certified Airport Environmental Management System (AEMS). This enables operators to report the airport's impacts on surface water, groundwater, and noise. Airport-wide environmental management practices are also continually revised with this technology, and annual objectives and targets are determined to avoid or mitigate adverse environmental impacts. In addition, airport employees receive environmental training. In 2004, HPN was the third airport in the U.S. to achieve this level of environmental performance.

In May 2011, the New York State Department of Transportation published the "New York Statewide Airport Economic Impact Study," highlighting the economic impacts of public-use airports in New York state for fiscal year 2009. The study noted that HPN was one of only three airports in the state that increased its enplanements, surpassing the U.S. benchmark. It also noted that the cumulative economic activity for the airport was approximately $736 million.

Approaches
The airport can be accessed from I-684's Exit 2 onto New York State Route 120. More directly, the terminals are accessed by NY Route 135.

IATA code
The IATA code for Westchester County Airport is HPN. The origins of this code are in dispute. Some believe it is derived from the name of the city, White Plains (IATA codes normally do not begin with W because those are reserved for radio signals), while others maintain the IATA code represents the first letter of the airport's three neighboring communities, Harrison, Purchase, and North Castle. The full ICAO code for Westchester County Airport is KHPN.

Facilities and aircraft
Westchester County Airport covers 702 acres (284 ha) at an elevation of 439 feet (134 m) above mean sea level. It has two asphalt paved runways: 16/34 is 6,549 by 150 feet (1,996 x 46 m) and 11/29 is 4,451 by 150 feet (1,357 x 46 m). Runway 29's threshold is displaced 1,297 feet (395 m) due to trees obstructing the approach path. The trees (in Connecticut) are 37 ft (11 m) tall and 370 ft (113 m) from the end of the runway.

Westchester County Airport has several fixed-base operators (FBOs), including Signature Flight Support East and West, Ross Aviation East and West, NetJets, and Million Air. Although varied in services offered, the FBOs at Westchester County Airport provide Jet A and 100LL fueling services, repairs and maintenance, aircraft tiedowns, de-icing, United States Customs, and other aircraft services. Some of the FBOs are particularly luxurious, providing limousine transportation services and deluxe surroundings.

There are three flight schools.  Performance Flight operates out of the Million Air at Hangar M, while Academy of Aviation operates out of Ross Aviation West at Hangar T. Wings Air offers helicopter flight training out of Hangar T. Additionally, the Westchester Flying Club, a private organization of pilots, is based at the airport as well as the Westchester Aviation Association, a not-for-profit organization that promotes aviation education and understanding on the part of government authorities and the public.

Westchester County Airport is also the home of the New York Wing Civil Air Patrol headquarters, the Lt. Anthony L. Willsea Cadet Squadron (NY-422).

Aircraft Rescue Fire Fighting (ARFF) is provided by Airport Operations Crews.  The airport owns three ARFF apparatuses (three Oshkosh Striker 1500s), two of which are in service full-time. The ARFF Crews only respond to aircraft emergencies.  All structure-related fire and rescue calls are deferred to the local fire departments. The Purchase Fire Department, for example, handles all structure calls on the southern part of the airfield, the Armonk Fire Department handles calls on the northern part and the Rye Brook/Port Chester Fire Department handle all calls on the east end, including the main terminal. EMS calls are handled by Port Chester-Rye-Rye Brook EMS, Harrison EMS and Armonk Fire/EMS depending on location of call.

In 2010, the airport had 191,017 total aircraft operations, an average of 523 per day: 23% commercial aviation, 48% heavy general aviation, and 29% light general aviation. 316 aircraft, including helicopters, are based out of this airport.
An aircraft must have a maximum gross weight of 120,000 pounds or less, or permission from the manager, to land at the airport.

Terminal

Westchester County Airport has one small, three-level terminal with six gates, of which only four can be used simultaneously because only four aircraft can be scheduled to use the terminal's ramp at any given time. The $35 million terminal was built in 1995 and designed by Lothrop Associates. Gates A, B, C, and F have jetways. The terminal also has a luggage carousel, a baggage reclaim office and two Transportation Security Administration (TSA) screening lanes. Passenger amenities include a gift shop, departure lounge, and food concessions such as a Dunkin' Donuts.

In November 2015, the airport began a $30 million construction project to expand the terminal and ramp areas. The project will expand the terminal by 20% and include additional check-in, screening and passenger waiting areas. The expansion will also include the addition of four new jet bridges. A separate terminal with "lodge-like ambiance" to serve passengers of private jets opened in 2019.

Airlines and destinations

Statistics

Airline market share

^PSA Airlines operates American Eagle flights to Charlotte, NC and Washington–National, D.C. At the time when these statistics were measured, SkyWest operated American Eagle flights to Chicago-O’Hare, IL. Currently, Envoy Air operates the Chicago-O’Hare flights.

^^Endeavor Air operates Delta Connection flights to Atlanta, GA while SkyWest operates Delta Connection flights to both Atlanta, GA and Detroit, MI.

Top destinations

Controversy
Expansion of the airport has raised concerns over adverse environmental impacts by numerous community advocacy groups and area residents. The facility lies between the Blind Brook watershed and the Rye Lake watershed/Kensico Reservoir. The Citizens for a Responsible County Airport, which count the Sierra Club Lower Hudson and Federated Conservationists of Westchester as supporters, has raised safety concerns about the stormwater runoff directed towards Westchester and New York City's drinking water supply. They are especially alarmed about PFAS discovered in groundwater tests between the Airport and the Kensico watershed.

In popular culture
 The airport was a filming location for The Best Man, Random Hearts, and Meet The Parents.
 In The West Wing episode "Celestial Navigation", Leo tells Toby and Sam to "Fly to Westchester County Airport and rent a car" to get their United States Supreme Court nominee, Roberto Mendoza, out of jail in Connecticut.
 In an episode of The Newsroom, Don Keefer explains to Sloan Sabbith that the most likely airports for out-of-town equity firm executives to use while visiting New York City in their private jets would be either "Teterboro or White Plains."
 In Shaft 2000 Walter Wade Jr. lands in his personal jet in this airport after two-year flight from justice. After the landing he is rearrested by John Shaft right in the airport.

Accidents and incidents
 December 18, 1954: A Lockheed Model 18 Lodestar, aircraft registration number N711SE, clipped trees about  before it struck the ground on a  knoll located on the instrument landing system (ILS) approach path. Both pilots were killed.
 February 11, 1981: A Lockheed Jetstar, registration N520S, crashed  from the approach end of the runway into a heavily wooded area. The aircraft's electrical system had malfunctioned causing a deviation of the flightpath. The two crew and six passengers died.
 December 24, 1988: A Beechcraft A36 Bonanza, registration N555ST, crashed and was destroyed after departure in instrument meteorological conditions (IMC); the pilot and two passengers were killed. The crash occurred about 35 seconds after the pilot acknowledged an air traffic control (ATC) instruction to change radio frequencies, and witnesses reported that the aircraft was flying in a circle before impact. The National Transportation Safety Board (NTSB) attributed the accident to spatial disorientation, pilot distraction, and the pilot's failure to maintain the climb; poor visibility was a contributing factor.
 June 14, 1990: A Cessna 337G Skymaster, registration N72476, went into a stall and crashed after flying through low clouds on approach. The pilot, who did not have an instrument rating nor any documented experience with instrument flight rules (IFR) operations, had been given a special visual flight rules (SVFR) landing clearance after being advised of IMC at the airport. The aircraft was destroyed and the pilot and single passenger were killed. The NTSB attributed the accident to the pilot's decision to fly under visual flight rules into instrument meteorological conditions (VFR into IMC) and his subsequent loss of aircraft control. Bad weather and the pilot's lack of IFR experience were contributing factors.
 June 22, 2001: A Piper PA-32R-301, registration N13VH, struck the ground while the pilot was executing a missed approach in low visibility; the crash destroyed the aircraft and killed the pilot, who was the sole aircraft occupant. Immediately prior to the accident, the pilot had failed to respond to ATC, and performed a series of erratic ascents and descents. Post-crash toxicology tests found signs of chlorpheniramine, a sedating antihistamine, in the pilot's blood and urine. The National Transportation Safety Board (NTSB) attributed the accident to loss of control and spatial disorientation. Contributing factors were fog and the pilot's use of sedating medication.
 December 31, 2001: A Beechcraft BE-23-B24R Sierra, registration N2173W, lost altitude in a steep turn and crashed in a parking lot while maneuvering to land. The crash and ensuing fire destroyed the aircraft and killed the pilot, who was the sole aircraft occupant. The pilot had diverted to Westchester County Airport after losing radio communications; the cause of the radio failure was not conclusively determined. The NTSB attributed the accident to a loss of aircraft control.
 April 23, 2005: A Cessna 172R, registration N61AF, crashed into trees about  short of runway 16 during a practice ILS approach in IMC. The aircraft was destroyed and the student pilot and flight instructor were killed. The NTSB attributed the accident to the pilot's failure to maintain adequate altitude. Contributing factors were low ceilings, fog, and gusty wind.
 June 18, 2011: A Cessna T210N, registration N210KW, crashed on approach after the pilot took off from Westchester County Airport, immediately declared an emergency of an unspecified nature, and attempted to return. The aircraft came to rest inverted and was consumed in a post-crash fire, killing the pilot and all three passengers. Witnesses reported that the engine ran poorly before the flight and that the pilot performed an unusually large number of engine runups, while post-crash examination of the engine found evidence of severe detonation and improper timing of one magneto. Furthermore, noise abatement recordings from the airport revealed that the engine was significantly quieter on approach than during departure, suggesting that the pilot had reduced the power setting. The NTSB attributed the accident to "The pilot's decision to depart on the flight with a suspected mechanical deficiency and his subsequent decision to fly the final approach at a reduced power setting. Contributing to the accident was the improper timing of the magneto(s) that resulted in a severe detonation event."
 June 13, 2014: A Piper PA-46-500TP, registration N5335R, crashed into trees at high speed immediately after an IMC takeoff, destroying the aircraft and killing the pilot, who was the sole occupant. Reportedly in a rush, the pilot arrived at the airport 1 hour and 15 minutes prior to his scheduled departure time, demanding that the aircraft be readied immediately; the aircraft departed 23 minutes later. The accident was attributed to "The pilot's failure to maintain a positive climb rate after takeoff due to spatial disorientation (somatogravic illusion). Contributing to the accident was the pilot's self-induced pressure to depart and his decision to depart in low-ceiling and low-visibility conditions."
 January 19, 2023: a Beechcraft A36 Bonanza, registration N19MT, crashed into trees on the northern edge of Rye Lake, which is located next the airport, killing both occupants, the pilot and a passenger. The aircraft, en route to Cuyahoga County Airport from John F. Kennedy International Airport, reported low oil pressure and then engine problems to White Plains ATC approximately a mile away from the airport at 5:25pm ET. 5 minutes later, contact with the aircraft was lost, before reportedly crashing at around 5:38pm ET. The FAA and NTSB are currently investigating the crash.

References

33.
https://www.newstimes.com/news/amp/Teens-in-stolen-plane-ask-for-a-break-53653.php

External links

 Westchester County Airport, official site
  from New York State DOT
 
 
 Aerial image as of April 1991 from USGS The National Map
 

Airports in New York (state)
Harrison, New York
Transportation buildings and structures in Westchester County, New York
Airports established in 1942
1942 establishments in New York (state)